BRP Lolinato To-ong (PG-902) is second ship of the class of the  of the Philippine Navy. She was commissioned with the Philippine Navy on 28 November 2022 and is currently in active service with the Littoral Combat Force, Philippine Fleet.

Namesake
First Lieutenant Lolinato To-ong, PN (Marines) was a Philippine Marine Corps officer and a posthumous recipient of the Philippines' highest military award for courage, the Medal of Valor.

Then-First Lieutenant To-ong served with the 52nd Marine Company of the Force Reconnaissance Battalion during the 2000 Philippine campaign against the Moro Islamic Liberation Front. In a military operation in Matanog, Maguindanao, To-ong and enlisted Marine Domingo Deluana were themselves wounded while providing suppressive fire to cover the medical evacuation of wounded fellow Marines. Despite their wounds, they continued manoeuvring and providing cover fire until an RPG blast caught the pair.  Both To-ong and Deluana were killed in action.

History
In 2019, the Philippine Navy raised a requirement to procure a new class of coastal patrol interdiction craft (CPIC) that would be missile-capable and are based on Israel's Shaldag V patrol boat design, and would replace the Tomas Batilo-class fast attack crafts that have been retired in service.

A contract was signed between the (DND), Israel Shipyards Ltd. and Israeli Ministry of Defense on 9 February 2021, with the Notice to Proceed to start the effectivity of the contract released on 27 April 2021.

The second boat of the class, the BRP Lolinato To-ong (PG-902), was launched on 27 June 2022, and became the basis for the class' name. The hull number's use of "PG" indicates that the boats are classified as Patrol Gunboats based on Philippine Navy's naming classification standards.

Design

Armament
The ship class was designed to carry one bow-mounted Mk.44 Bushmaster II autocannon mounted on Rafael Typhoon Mk 30-C remote-controlled weapon station, and two M2HB Browning 12.7 mm/50-cal. heavy machine guns mounted on Rafael Mini Typhoon remote-controlled weapon stations.

It is also one of the few ships of the class that has a Rafael Typhoon MLS-NLOS missile launcher for Spike-NLOS surface-to-surface missiles, which is its primary weapon system that provides a combat reach of up to 25 kilometers (16 miles).

References

Ships of the Philippine Navy
2022 ships